Paracorophium excavatum is a species of amphipod in the family Corophiidae. It has been confused with other species, such that the only reliable record is from its type locality at Brighton, Otago.

References

Corophiidea
Freshwater crustaceans of New Zealand
Crustaceans described in 1884